Ivar Stakgold (December 13, 1925 – May 29, 2018) was a Norwegian-born American academic mathematician and bridge player from Newark, Delaware. As the sole author of two books he specialized in boundary value problems (LCSH).

Life

Stakgold was born in Oslo, Norway to parents with Russian-Jewish heritage. He studied applied mathematics at Harvard University and earned the Ph.D. in 1949 with a dissertation, The Cauchy Relations In A Molecular Theory of Elasticity, under Léon Nicolas Brillouin. He was professor emeritus of mathematical sciences at the University of Delaware and a researcher at the University of California, San Diego. He was a former president of the Society for Industrial and Applied Mathematics (SIAM).

Books  

By Stakgold 
 Boundary Value Problems of Mathematical Physics, 2 vols. (Macmillan, 1967), Macmillan series in advanced mathematics and theoretical physics, ; reprint 2000, SIAM Classics in applied mathematics, no. 29
 Nonlinear Problems in the Physical Sciences and Biology: proceedings of a Battelle Summer Institute, Seattle, July 3–28, 1972, eds. Stakgold and others (Springer-Verlag, 1973),  
 Green's Functions and Boundary Value Problems (Wiley, 1979); 2nd ed. 1998; 3rd ed. 2011, Stakgold and Michael J. Holst
 Analytical and Computational Methods in Scattering and Applied Mathematics, eds. Fadil Santosa and Stakgold (Chapman & Hall/CRC, 2000) – "A volume to the memory of Ralph Ellis Kleinman",  

Other
 Nonlinear Problems in Applied Mathematics: in honor of Ivar Stakgold on his 70th birthday,eds. T.S. Angell and others (Philadelphia:SIAM, 1996),

Bridge accomplishments

Awards

 Mott-Smith Trophy (1) 1958

Wins

 North American Bridge Championships (5)
 Silodor Open Pairs (1) 1958 
 Vanderbilt (1) 1958 
 Chicago Mixed Board-a-Match (1) 1969 
 Reisinger (1) 1958 
 Spingold (1) 1962

Runners-up

 Bermuda Bowl (1) 1959
 North American Bridge Championships
 Silodor Open Pairs (1) 1963 
 Mitchell Board-a-Match Teams (1) 1957 
 Spingold (1) 1958

References

External links

 
 
 

1925 births
2018 deaths
20th-century American mathematicians
American contract bridge players
Bermuda Bowl players
Norwegian people of Russian-Jewish descent
Norwegian emigrants to the United States
American people of Russian-Jewish descent
People from Newark, Delaware 
University of Delaware faculty
University of California, San Diego faculty
Presidents of the Society for Industrial and Applied Mathematics
Harvard University alumni